The Rocks of Valpré is a 1913 novel by the British writer Ethel M. Dell. First published in the United States in 1913. It is set in the mid-nineteenth century when an officer wrongly imprisoned on Devil's Island escapes and heads to Europe to rescue the love of his life from the villain.

Reception 
Contemporary reviews of the novel were mixed. The New York Times called the novel "a well constructed and closely knit tale." Other reviews noted its "sentimentality", with the Boston Transcript calling the novel a "deft old fashioned novel with much variety of interest and some effective character drawing. It comes dangerously near shipwreak on the rock of sentimentality, but never becomes quite mawkish."

It was a bestseller, including in Canada.

Adaptations
The novel has twice been adapted into a film. A 1919 silent version The Rocks of Valpré was directed by Maurice Elvey. In 1935 a sound version The Rocks of Valpré was directed by Henry Edwards.

References 

1913 British novels
British novels adapted into films
Novels by Ethel M. Dell
Novels set in the 19th century
Fiction about prison escapes